Meden Vale is a small former coal mining village originally known as Welbeck Colliery Village prior to renaming in the late 1960s.

It is situated close to the small town of Market Warsop, in north Nottinghamshire, England, off the main A60 Mansfield to Worksop road, and lies within Mansfield District Council administrative area and Mansfield Parliamentary constituency, represented since 2017 by Ben Bradley of the Conservative Party. It is in the civil parish of Warsop.

There is a small collection of shops, Post Office, a garage and the Three Lions public house. The River Meden flows through the village alongside the main road. The village has a rugby union side which plays in the RFU Midlands 5 East (North) division.

Former colliery
The economy was based mainly on Welbeck Colliery, which started up when two shafts were sunk between 1912 and 1915. It was determined by owner UK Coal for closure in 2007 due to limited reserves, with the last coal produced 11 May 2010. When closed it was one of the last remaining deep mine collieries to operate in England, and at its peak employed 1,400 men and produced 1.5 million tonnes of coal yearly.

The headstocks were demolished by explosives in April 2011.

Explosion
Two security guards were badly injured in an explosion confined to a surface electrical substation at the Colliery site on Saturday 31 December 2011.

References

External links 

Meden Vale Rugby
Market Warsop Community page
Welbeck Colliery History page

Villages in Nottinghamshire
Mansfield District